Mount Tangjia is a mountain in Sichuan Province, China,  away from the county seat of Beichuan County.

It overlooks the Jian River and Tangjiashan Lake, a landslide dam-created lake which was formed by the 2008 Sichuan earthquake.

References

Mountains of Sichuan